German Bank may refer to:

Germany
Deutsche Bank
Deutsche Bundesbank
Banking in Germany

United States
German Bank (Evansville, Indiana)
German Bank (Dubuque, Iowa)
German Bank Building of Walnut, Iowa
German Bank Building, Louisville, Kentucky
German-American Bank Building, St. Joseph, Missouri